Lengilu is a nearly extinct language of Indonesian Borneo. At present, there are only four native speakers of Lengilu.

References

Apo Duat languages
Languages of Indonesia
Endangered Austronesian languages